Libidibia paraguariensis (the guayacaú negro or ibirá-berá) is a species of legume in the family Fabaceae.
It is found in Argentina, Bolivia, Brazil, and Paraguay.
It is threatened by habitat loss.
Guayacaú negro is used for timber in several Latin American countries, especially Argentina and Paraguay. Commercially it is marketed as Argentinian brown ebony, mistakenly as Brazilian ebony, and as a family group as partridgewood. The end use for this timber is typically high-end exotic hardwood flooring, cabinetry and turnings.

Its flowers are very attractive to bees.

References

Caesalpinieae
Vulnerable plants
Trees of Argentina
Trees of Bolivia
Trees of Brazil
Trees of Paraguay
Taxonomy articles created by Polbot
Plants described in 1862